Hamed Hamdan Al-Balushi (born 2 March 1980), commonly known as Hamed Al-Balushi, is an Omani footballer who plays for Fanja SC.

Club career statistics

International career
Hamed was selected for the national team for the first time in 2007. He has represented the national team in the 2007 AFC Asian Cup.

References

External links

Hamed Al-Balushi at Goal.com

1980 births
Living people
Omani footballers
Oman international footballers
Association football forwards
2007 AFC Asian Cup players
Fanja SC players
Omani people of Baloch descent
Footballers at the 2006 Asian Games
Asian Games competitors for Oman